Abdullah Abdulqader (Arabic:عبد الله عبد القادر) (born 2 July 1989) is an Emirati footballer. He currently plays for Hatta as a winger.

External links

References

Emirati footballers
1989 births
Living people
Al Jazira Club players
Sharjah FC players
Dubai CSC players
Ajman Club players
Al Dhafra FC players
Hatta Club players
Place of birth missing (living people)
UAE Pro League players
UAE First Division League players
Association football wingers